Milind Vaidya  is Shiv Sena Politician from Mumbai. He was the former Mayor of Brihanmumbai Municipal Corporation.

Positions held
 1992: Elected as corporator in Brihanmumbai Municipal Corporation 
 1996: Elected as Mayor of Brihanmumbai Municipal Corporation
 2011: Re-elected as corporator in Brihanmumbai Municipal Corporation  
 2017: Re-elected as corporator in Brihanmumbai Municipal Corporation 
 2017: Elected as Chairman of G North ward Committee Brihanmumbai Municipal Corporation

References

External links
 Shivsena Home Page
 बृहन्मुंबई महानगरपालिका

Living people
Mayors of Mumbai
Marathi politicians
Shiv Sena politicians
Year of birth missing (living people)